Pantai Jerudong Specialist Centre is a private hospital located in Jerudong, Brunei-Muara District, Brunei.

Location 
The hospital is located up north of Jerudong Park and lies on the right of Jerudong Park Medical Centre. PJSC is also located at the coast overlooking the South China Sea and the west of the BRIDEX International Conference Centre.

History 
It houses The Brunei Cancer Centre (TBCC), a medical centre in the country for treating cancer-related cases, and the Brunei Neuroscience Stroke and Rehabilitation Centre (BNSRC), a medical centre for stroke rehabilitation and other neurological cases. Both centres were completed in 2017.

On 22 June 2019, Institute of Brunei Technical Education signed a Memorandum of Understanding (MoU) with the hospital. Baiduri Bank collaborated with PJSC to host a cancer awareness workshop in the bank's headquarters.

References 

Hospitals in Brunei